The 2015 All-Ireland Under-21 Hurling Championship was the 52nd staging of the All-Ireland championship for since its establishment by the Gaelic Athletic Association in 1964. The draws for the various 2015 fixtures took place in October 2014. The championship began on 27 May 2015 and ended on 12 September 2015.

Clare were the defending champions, however, they were defeated in the provincial decider. Limerick won the title following a 0-26 to 1-7 defeat of Wexford in the final.

Team summaries

Results

Leinster Under-21 Hurling Championship

Munster Under-21 Hurling Championship

Ulster Under-21 Hurling Championship

All-Ireland Under-21 Hurling Championship

Statistics

Top scorers

Overall

Single game

Scoring

Widest winning margin: 33 points
Antrim 6-22 - 0-7 Armagh (Ulster semi-final)
Most goals in a match:  6
Laois 4-7 - 2-15 Carlow (Leinster quarter-final)
Dublin 2-16 - 4-12 Kilkenny (Leinster quarter-final)
Antrim 6-22 - 0-7 Armagh (Ulster semi-final)
Derry 3-16 - 3-14 Down (Ulster semi-final)
Limerick 3-16 - 3-14 Tipperary (Munster semi-final)
Most points in a match: 41
Clare 0-23 - 1-18 Waterford (Munster semi-final)
Most goals by one team in a match: 6
Antrim 6-22 - 0-7 Armagh (Ulster semi-final)
 Highest aggregate score: 47
Antrim 6-22 - 0-7 Armagh (Ulster semi-final)
Most goals scored by a losing team: 4
Laois 4-7 - 2-15 Carlow (Leinster quarter-final)

Miscellaneous

 Wexford win a third successive Leinster title. It is the third time in their history that they have achieved the three-in-a-row and the first time since 1971.	
 Antrim win a record-breaking seventh successive Ulster title.

Broadcasting

These matches were broadcast live on television in Ireland by TG4:

External links
 Leinster Under-21 Hurling Championship fixtures
 Munster Under-21 Hurling Championship fixtures
 Ulster Under-21 Hurling Championship fixtures

References

Under-21
All-Ireland Under-21 Hurling Championship